The discography of Puerto Rican rapper Bryant Myers consists of two studio albums, one collaborative album, one extended play, and 136 singles (including 71 as a featured artist).

Albums

Studio albums

Collaborative albums

Extended plays

Singles

As lead artist

Notes
 Note 1: Peak prior to being combined with "Gan-Ga" (Remix)
 Note 2: Uses combined chart entries for "Gan-Ga" and "Gan-Ga" (Remix)

As featured artist

Other charted songs

Guest appearances

Notes

References 

Discographies of Puerto Rican artists
Hip hop discographies
Reggaeton discographies